Angustalius malacelloides is a moth in the family Crambidae. It was described by Stanisław Błeszyński in 1955. It is found in the Himalayas, India, Sri Lanka, China (Guangdong), Malaysia, Java, Australia (Tasmania) and New Zealand.

Subspecies
Angustalius malacelloides malacelloides (Australia)
Angustalius malacelloides javaicus (Błeszyński, 1955) (Java)

References
Błeszyński, 1965. Studies on the Crambidae (Lepidoptera) - Part IX. Notes on the genus Crambopsis De Lattin. - POLSKIE PISMO ENTOMOLOGICZNE 25 (15):227-231.

Crambinae
Moths described in 1955
Moths of New Zealand
Moths of Australia
Moths of Asia